Ehud de Shalit (born 16 March 1955) is an Israeli number theorist and professor at the Hebrew University of Jerusalem.

Biography
Ehud de Shalit was born in Rehovot. His father was Amos de-Shalit. He completed his B.Sc. at the Hebrew University in 1975, and his Ph.D. at Princeton University in 1984 under the supervision of Andrew Wiles.

Academic career
De Shalit joined the faculty of Hebrew University in 1987 and was promoted to full professor in 2001. He is an editor for the Israel Journal of Mathematics.

Published works

References

External links
 

1955 births
Living people
Hebrew University of Jerusalem alumni
Academic staff of the Hebrew University of Jerusalem
Israeli Jews
Israeli mathematicians
Number theorists
People from Rehovot
Princeton University alumni